Rumlange is a village in the commune of Wincrange, in northern Luxembourg.  , the village had a population of 115.

Notable people
 Josephine Jaans World War II resistance fighter

References

Villages in Luxembourg
Wincrange